James Julius Wood (1800–1877) was a 19th-century Scottish minister who served as Moderator of the General Assembly of the Free Church of Scotland 1857/8.

Life

He was born in Jedburgh on 4 September 1800 the son of Dr William Wood MD and his wife Isabella Hedley. He was grandson of James Wood, a minister from Calton in Edinburgh. He studied Divinity at Glasgow University graduating MA. He was licensed to preach by the Presbytery of Jedburgh in October 1825. He was ordained as a minister of the Church of Scotland at Newton-on-Ayr in 1827.

In 1836, he was translated to Stirling and in 1839 to New Greyfriars in central Edinburgh. He left the church in the Disruption of 1843 but his congregation did not follow him. He fell into ill-health and spent some years in the Mediterranean trying to improve his health with church duties in Malta and Madeira. When on leave of absence for ill-health acted as chaplain to 42nd Royal Highlanders at Malta 1842. He resided two years in Madeira, and subsequently assisted Dr Guthrie, Dr Clason, and others.

He returned to Scotland in 1848 to take on St George's Free Church in Dumfries, replacing Rev Mackenzie who moved to Birmingham. Dumfries was in the midst of a cholera epidemic when he arrived being inducted on 8 June 1848. The church grew until it had more than 600 communicant members. Glasgow University awarded him an honorary doctorare (Doctor of Divinity) in 1856. In 1857, he was elected Moderator of the General Assembly of the Free Church. In 1858, he was succeeded by Alexander Beith. In 1861, he was highly involved in the Revival Movement.

He died in Dumfries on 27 March 1877. Wood has a memorial stone in St. Mary’s churchyard, Dumfries.

Family

He married 21 October 1833, Christian Inglis (died 14 February 1886), daughter of James Henderson, (Inland Revenue), and Sophia Young, and had issue — 
William, born 31 July 1834, who died in New Zealand
Sophia, born 8 March 1836 (married David Norris Mackay (1817-1875), Free Church minister at Rafford Lossiemouth
Isabella Hedley, born 13 May 1838
James, banker, Sydney, Australia, born 14 March 1840
Julius, M.D., lieut.-col. I.M.S., born 10 April 1842
besides one who died in infancy.

Publications 
Two single Sermons (Edinburgh, 1841-7) - The Name of God revealed by himself
Letter to the Congregation of New Greyfriars, from Malta, 1843
Address to the Congregation of New Greyfriars, on occasion of quitting the Establishment (Edinburgh, 1843)
Lecture to Young Men (Glasgow, 1842)
Letters to Rev Henry Small (1853)
Letters to Rev Henry Small (1853)
Notes on Madeira. A series of 7 articles from 1846: 1st, 2nd, 3rd, 4th, 5th, 6th, 7th
Dr Kalley's Imprisonment and Labours (article from 1846)
Shameful persecutions of the converted Portuguese (article from 1846)
The minister's New Year's salutation (article from 1846)
Letters to Rev Henry Small (1853)

Artistic recognition

He was photographed by Hill & Adamson in 1857. St George's church website reports "In April 1870, a photograph was taken of Dr. Wood, aged 70 years, surrounded by his elders and deacons. Each person can be identified by name and in most cases, his occupation. This remarkable photograph hangs in St. George’s today"

In 1860, he was photographed with other ex-moderators at the steps of New College, Edinburgh.

References
Citations

Sources

 

1800 births
1877 deaths
People from Jedburgh
Alumni of the University of Glasgow
19th-century Ministers of the Free Church of Scotland
People from Dumfries